Snarler may refer to:

Armstrong Siddeley Snarler - a British rocket engine
A character in the Pretenders (Transformers) toy line